Alain Anthony Pons (born 16 September 1995) is a Gibraltarian football midfielder who currently plays for St Joseph's and the Gibraltar national football team.

Club career
Pons came through the youth ranks at AD Taraguilla in Spain, breaking into the senior team in 2013 before moving to his home country of Gibraltar to sign for Lincoln Red Imps. While studying at University of Central Lancashire, he remained contracted to Lincoln, occasionally playing for the first team while also representing UCLan's football team. Returning to Gibraltar after his studies, he signed for Gibraltar United, but this stay would be short lived as he would re-sign for Lincoln in January 2017. Again, he would feature primarily in the reserve teams, appearing on the bench several times but not playing. In August 2019, Pons signed for St Joseph's.

International career
Pons has been capped 5 times for the Gibraltar national under-19 football team, making his debut in 2013. In 2015, he played for a development squad at the 2015 Island Games, scoring once as Gibraltar finished a disappointing 10th place. Having been called up to several senior squads without playing, he finally made his debut as a substitute for the senior team on August 31, 2017, in an eventual 9–0 defeat to Belgium.

Career statistics

International

References

External links
 
 

Living people
1995 births
Gibraltarian footballers
Gibraltar international footballers
Gibraltar United F.C. players
Lincoln Red Imps F.C. players
Association football defenders
Gibraltar Premier Division players
Gibraltar youth international footballers